This is a list of bridges and viaducts in Russia, including those for pedestrians and vehicular traffic.

Historical and architectural interest bridges

Major road and railway bridges 
This table presents the structures with spans greater than 100 meters (non-exhaustive list).

Notes and references 
 Notes

 

 Others references

See also 

 List of bridges in Moscow
 List of bridges in Saint Petersburg
 Transport in Russia
 Rail transport in Russia
 Russian federal highways
 Geography of Russia

External links

Further reading